Šujica may refer to:

Places 
Šujica, Slovenia, village in Slovenia
Šuica, Bosnia and Herzegovina, village in Bosnia and Herzegovina

Rivers 
Šuica (river), river in Bosnia and Herzegovina